Tavilehgah-e Olya (also Romanized as Ţavīlehgāh-e ‘Olyā; also known as Ţavīleh-ye ‘Olyā) is a village in Jalalvand Rural District, Firuzabad District, Kermanshah County, Kermanshah Province, Iran. At the 2006 census, its population was 36, in 8 families.

References 

Populated places in Kermanshah County